The 2018 AFF Championship qualification tournament was the qualification process for the 2018 AFF Championship, the twelfth edition of the AFF Championship. Brunei and Timor-Leste contested the tenth and final remaining berth for the AFF Championship final tournament in two home-and-away matches. On 7 August 2018, organising committees confirmed the venue where Timor-Leste will play Brunei has been changed due to floodlighting issues. The opening match was held at Kuala Lumpur Stadium, Malaysia, not as per originally planned at National Stadium, Dili.

Timor-Leste advanced to the AFF Championship group stage and were placed in Group B after winning by 3–2 on aggregate from two qualifying matches.

Venues

Qualification

Timor-Leste won 3–2 on aggregate.

Goalscorers
2 goals

  Henrique Cruz

1 goal

  Azwan Ali Rahman
  Najib Tarif
  Silveiro Garcia

References

2018 AFF Championship
Timor-Leste national football team matches
Brunei national football team matches
September 2018 sports events in Asia
2018 in AFF football
2018 in Brunei football
2018 in Timor Leste football
2018 in Malaysian football